LDT may stand for:

 Laterodorsal tegmental nucleus, a nucleus in the brain stem
 Laboratory developed test,  in vitro diagnostics
 Labordatenträger, a German xDT format to transfer laboratory tests
 Large deviations theory, field of probability theory
 Learning Design and Technology, an academic program
 Lexical decision task in psychology experiments
 Lightning Data Transport, later HyperTransport computer bus
 Local Descriptor Table, an x86 data structure
 Telbivudine or LdT, a drug for hepatitis B
 Computer file extension for EULUMDAT